Marina Melani Delgado (born 12 June 1995) is an Argentine footballer who plays as a full back for Primera División A club UAI Urquiza and the Argentina women's national team.

International career
Delgado made her senior debut for Argentina on 7 November 2019, in a 2–1 away friendly won against Paraguay.

Honors and awards

Clubs
UAI Urquiza
Primera División A: 2018–19

References

External links
 

1995 births
Living people
Women's association football fullbacks
Argentine women's footballers
Sportspeople from Mar del Plata
Argentina women's international footballers
UAI Urquiza (women) players